The members of the first Legislative Yuan were elected in the January 1948 elections. A total of 773 representatives were to be elected, consisting of:
622 representatives from the provinces and municipalities
22 representatives from the Mongolian Leagues
15 Elected representatives from Tibet
6 Elected representatives by various racial groups in frontier regions
19 Elected representatives by Chinese citizens residing abroad
89 representatives of occupational groups

List of members

References